Tõnis Mölder (born 9 October 1989) is an Estonian politician. A member of the Centre Party, Mölder has been the Estonian Minister for the Environment since January 2021. Previous to this, he was a member of the Riigikogu, the Estonian parliament, the Deputy Mayor of Tallinn, and the Elder of Pirita.

References

External links

1989 births
21st-century Estonian politicians
Environment ministers of Estonia
Estonian Centre Party politicians
Living people
Members of the Riigikogu, 2019–2023
Members of the Riigikogu, 2023–2027
People from Lääneranna Parish
Tallinn University alumni